Governor Jones may refer to:

 Brereton Jones (born 1939), 58th Governor of Kentucky
 Daniel Webster Jones (governor) (1839–1918), 19th Governor of Arkansas
 Glyn Smallwood Jones (1908–1992), 1st Governor-General of Malawi from 1964 to 1966 and 11th Governor of Nyasaland from 1961 to 1964
 James C. Jones (1809–1859), 10th Governor of Tennessee
 John Edward Jones (governor) (1840–1896), 8th Governor of Nevada
 Mervyn Jones (born 1942), Governor of the Turks and Caicos Islands from 2000 to 2002
 Robert Taylor Jones (1884–1958), 6th Governor of Arizona
 Sam H. Jones (1897–1978), 46th Governor of Louisiana
 Thomas G. Jones (1844–1914), 28th Governor of Alabama
 William Jones (governor) (1753–1822), 8th Governor of Rhode Island